Rose Kennedy was a Papal countess, philanthropist, socialite, and mother of President John F. Kennedy

May also refer to:
Rosemary Kennedy, daughter of Rose Kennedy
Rosie Kennedy, character in Bad Behaviour

See also 
Rose Kennedy Schlossberg, American actress and great-granddaughter of Rose Kennedy